The United States Women's Open, a.k.a. U.S. Women's Open or Women's U.S. Open, is an annual tournament for women, dedicated to ten-pin bowling in the United States.  From its inception in 1949 until its cancellation in 2004, after the Professional Women's Bowling Association (PWBA) folded, the event was held every year except for 1953, 1997 and 2002. From 1949 through 1970, the tournament was known as the Bowling Proprietors' Association of America (BPAA) Women's All-Star. From 1971 on, it became known as the U.S. Women's Open. Marion Ladewig won this tournament eight times when it was the BPAA Women's All-Star. Liz Johnson has the most modern era (since 1971) U.S. Women's Open victories with six. 

The U.S. Women's Open returned in 2007, being conducted by the United States Bowling Congress (USBC) from that year through 2010. The BPAA announced in June, 2010, that it would resume conducting the tournament, beginning in 2011. The TV finals for the 2011 event took place at Cowboys Stadium in Arlington, Texas.

The 2012 tournament held its final round outdoors in Reno, Nevada on a specially-prepared pair of lanes. As the telecast began, winds up to 24 mph (38 km/h) began to deposit dust onto the lane surface, making the lanes virtually unplayable with standard reactive equipment and angles. Players began switching to plastic bowling balls as the dust continued to accumulate. Kelly Kulick survived a 170–160 final match against Missy Parkin to take the title.

The tournament was not held in 2014, due to lack of viable sponsorship. Instead, the BPAA Women's All-Star returned for a year along with the Senior Women's US Open. The U.S. Women's Open returned for 2015, as the USBC and BPAA announced that Bowlmor AMF, the largest operator of bowling centers in the world, had signed on as the title sponsor. The 2015 U.S. Women's Open took place August 31 through September 6 in North Brunswick, New Jersey, as part of the re-launched PWBA Tour.

Tournament history

2022 Event 
The 2022 U.S. Women's Open was held June 15–21 at Kingpins Alley in South Glens Falls, New York, with the live finals broadcast on CBS Sports Network. The tournament had 90 entries and a total prize fund of $253,650, with a $60,000 top prize. Fifth-seeded Erin McCarthy climbed the ladder to win her second PWBA title and first major championship, defeating top qualifier Danielle McEwan in the final match.

A five-person stepladder format was used for the final round.

Final Standings

1. Erin McCarthy (Elkhorn, NE), $60,000
2. Danielle McEwan (Stony Point, NY), $30,000
3. Jordan Richard (Maumee, OH), $22,000
4. Shannon O'Keefe (Shiloh, IL), $17,000
5. Shayna Ng (Singapore), $13,000

Past winners 

U.S. Women's Open
 2022 – Erin McCarthy
 2021 – Josie Barnes
 2020 – Not held (COVID-19)
 2019 – Danielle McEwan
 2018 – Liz Kuhlkin
 2017 – Liz Johnson
 2016 – Liz Johnson
 2015 – Liz Johnson
 2013 – Liz Johnson
 2012 – Kelly Kulick
 2011 – Leanne Hulsenberg
 2010 – Kelly Kulick
 2009 – Tammy Boomershine
 2008 – Kim Terrell-Kearney
 2007 – Liz Johnson
 2003 – Kelly Kulick
 2001 – Kim Terrell
 2000 – Tennelle Grijalva (Milligan)
 1999 – Kim Adler
 1998 – Aleta Sill
 1996 – Liz Johnson
 1995 – Cheryl Daniels
 1994 – Aleta Sill
 1993 – Dede Davidson
 1992 – Tish Johnson
 1991 – Anne Marie Duggan
 1990 – Dana Miller-Mackie
 1989 – Robin Romeo
 1988 – Lisa Wagner
 1987 – Carol Norman
 1986 – Wendy Macpherson
 1985 – Pat Mercatanti
 1984 – Karen Ellingsworth
 1983 – Dana Miller
 1982 – Shinobu Saitoh
 1981 – Donna Adamek
 1980 – 'California' Pat Costello
 1979 – Diana Silva
 1978 – Donna Adamek
 1977 – Betty Morris
 1976 – Patty Costello
 1975 – Paula Carter (Sperber)
 1974 – 'California' Pat Costello
 1973 – Mildred Martorella
 1972 – Lorrie Koch
 1971 – Paula Sperber

BPAA Women's All-Star
 2014 - Shannon Pluhowsky
 1970 – Mary Baker
 1969 – Dottie Fothergill
 1968 – Dottie Fothergill
 1967 – Gloria Simon
 1966 – Joy Abel
 1965 – Ann Slattery
 1964 – LaVerne Carter
 1963 – Marion Ladewig
 1962 – Shirley Garms
 1961 – Phyllis Notaro
 1960 – Sylvia Wene
 1959 – Marion Ladewig
 1958 – Merle Matthews
 1957 (Dec. 1956) – Marion Ladewig
 1956 (Dec. 1955) – Anita Cantaline
 1955 – Sylvia Wene
 1954 – Marion Ladewig
 1952 – Marion Ladewig
 1951 – Marion Ladewig
 1950 – Marion Ladewig
 1949 – Marion Ladewig

References

External links 
Official web site
Previous winners (1949 to 2003)

Ten-pin bowling competitions in the United States